King's College is a co-educational day and boarding British curriculum school in Madrid, which provides British education for children from pre-nursery to year 13. It was founded in 1969 and is part of King's Group

King's Group is the owner company of King's College schools and is headquartered in Tenbury Wells, United Kingdom. As well as a boarding school also operating at this location, the Group also operates six other schools in Spain and Panama. Founded in 1969, King's Group now provides a British education for children from Pre-Nursery to Year 13.
Also part of the Group is King's College International, which specialises in summer residential language courses and academic year abroad programmes, King's Training, which offers language and management training to companies located in Spain and Panama and lastly Nexalia Services, which offers catering and maintenance services.

In February 2014, King's Group was granted permission from the Department for Education (DfE) in London to sponsor Academies and Free Schools in England.

History
Numbers rose at the opening of its first school, King's College, from 70 pupils in 1969 to nearly 500 by 1974. King's College soon outgrew its premises and by 1976 ten houses of differing size and design were in use in the Chamartín area of Madrid.

After occupying these temporary premises for some nine years, the main school moved in 1978 to its present, purpose-built premises in the residential area of Soto de Viñuelas to the north of Madrid. Since then many improvements and additions have included a residential wing for boarding students (and later a new Boarding House built in 2011, Tenbury House), a 25m heated swimming pool housed in a state of the art Sports Centre, a 400-seat auditorium, a Music School and an Early Years Learning Centre.

Pupils follow the English National Curriculum and are prepared for (I)GCSE and GCE "A" Levels, including a wide range of subjects. There are also optional Spanish studies and preparation for Spanish University entrance examinations, in the Spanish schools.

Over the years, further schools were added to King's Group – meaning that the group now has five more schools in Spain (Madrid, Alicante, Elche and Murcia), one in the United Kingdom, one in Panama City and most recently another was opened in Riga, Latvia (September 2017).

Schools

King's College, Soto de Viñuelas, Madrid

The main school site caters for more than 1600 pupils between the ages of 2 and 18 years (Pre-Nursery to Year 13). It is located in a 12-acre site in the countryside between the city and the Guadarrama mountains.

Facilities now include a variety of outdoor recreational areas, a floodlit artificial football pitch, a 25m heated indoor swimming pool, tennis courts, volleyball and basketball courts, 5-a-side and 11-a-side football pitches and a horse riding school & dedicated sports centre (built in 2017). The school also has 2 libraries and 2 multimedia centres, as well as computers and interactive whiteboards in all classrooms. There is a large auditorium, an art studio, 15 science laboratories and a Music School which boasts 2 music rooms and 6 smaller practice rooms.

The school is a member of HMC, COBIS, NABSS, BSA and CICAE.

New boarding accommodation, Tenbury House, was opened in September 2011 and is a purpose-built boarding residence which replaced the old accommodation wing housed within the school. All bedrooms in the accommodation have en-suite bathrooms, under-floor heating and access to wireless internet. The House also has a dining room, common room, TV room, multimedia study room and a kitchen which students can use to prepare light meals outside of dining hours.

As of 2018 King's College in Madrid altogether has about 2,000 students, with 80% of them being Spanish and the next-largest group of students being British.

King's College School, La Moraleja, Madrid

King's College School is located in La Moraleja, one of the residential areas in Madrid and 15 kilometres away from the city centre. The school houses over 500 pupils from age 3 to 16 years (Nursery to Year 11).

In Year 12, pupils are automatically offered a place to continue their studies at the Sixth Form in sister school King's College, Soto de Viñuelas.

King's Infant School, Chamartín, Madrid

Located in the Chamartín area of Madrid, close to where the original school was located before moving to Soto de Viñuelas, King's Infant School offers purpose-built facilities for boys and girls between the ages of 2 and 6 (Pre-Nursery to Year 2) and has a capacity of approximately 200 pupils.

The school offers classrooms, complete with independent bathrooms for the Nursery pupils, a library and computer room. Interactive whiteboards are available in some classrooms and shared areas.

From the age of seven (National Curriculum Year 3) onwards, pupils are educated at either the main site in Soto de Viñuelas (2 to 18 years) or at King's College School, La Moraleja (3 to 16 years).

King's College, The British School of Alicante  

Located 10 minutes from the city centre of Alicante, King's College Alicante educates more than 950 pupils, age 3-18 (Nursery - Year 13) via the English National Curriculum. The school offer preparation for entry to British, Spanish and international universities.

King's College, The British School of Murcia

A British school in La Torre Golf Resort offers the English National Curriculum to pupils from the age of 18 months to 18 years (Pre-Nursery - Year 13).

The school is approximately half an hour from Murcia city centre, 10 minutes from San Javier and 25 minutes from Cartagena and offers pupil transport to and from each nearby city.

Pupils study GCSE and A Levels in preparation for entering British, Spanish and international universities.

King's College, Panama 

Opened in September 2012 and is situated in Clayton, a suburb of Panama City. The school educates pupils from age 3 to 18 (Nursery - Year 13)

The school also houses a division of King's Training, which like its partner in Spain, offers adult training and coaching provision to businesses and individuals in Panama.

King's College, Latvia 

Opened in September 2017 and is situated in Latvia's capital city: Riga.  It is the first British school in the Baltics and educates children from the age of 3 (Nursery) and will eventually cater to pupils up to the age of 18 (Year 13)

About the Curriculum

The school offers the English National Curriculum (IGCSE's and A Levels) taught in English by native British and British trained teachers, along with local language classes.

Academic organisation

The schools' educational programme is based on the English National Curriculum and offers a British education to children from Pre-Nursery to University Entrance.

The curriculum leads to the GCSE examinations at the end of Year 11 (age 16), principally using the IGCSE board (Cambridge International Board, recognised generally as a higher standard). These studies are officially recognised by the Spanish Ministry of Education through the process of validation.

In their final two years at King's College, pupils study for the London University (Edexcel) GCE A Level examinations, leading to international university entrance.  In addition the school offers the "Parte Específica" to those A Level students wishing to apply for entrance to Spanish universities. In either case students may apply for places at universities throughout the world.

University entrance

The school has a Careers and University entrance Advisory Department which offers pupils help and advice when applying for Higher Education, whether in the UK or in the rest of the world.

See also
 Instituto Español Vicente Cañada Blanch - Spanish international school in London
 British migration to Spain

References

External links
King´s College, The British School of Madrid

Private schools in Spain
Educational institutions established in 1969
International schools in the Community of Madrid
British international schools in Spain
1969 establishments in Spain
Schools in Alcobendas